John Herron (born October 21, 1964) is a Canadian former politician and Red Tory.

Federal political career
Herron was first elected to the House of Commons in the 1997 federal election as a candidate of the Progressive Conservative Party of Canada (PC Party). He was reelected in the 2000 election.  Herron was one of a handful of new Progressive Conservative "young Turk" parliamentarians - along with Scott Brison, André Bachand, and Peter MacKay - considered the youthful leadership material that would restore the ailing Tories to their glory days.

After Progressive Conservative leader Jean Charest resigned in April 1998 to lead Quebec Federalists as leader of the Quebec Liberal Party, Herron and fellow MP Jim Jones met with Stephen Harper to explore Harper's interest in the leadership of the Progressive Conservative Party. Herron concluded that there was a lack of alignment between the two on a series of public policy matters, and later teamed with Scott Brison to support Joe Clark's candidacy and his subsequent return as leader of the Progressive Conservative Party of Canada.

Herron was criticized following the 2003 PC leadership election when he abandoned the campaign of Scott Brison to support Peter MacKay before the second ballot. Brison was dropped from the voting when he won just three votes fewer than Jim Prentice on the second ballot. Many blamed this loss on Herron and a handful of his riding delegates who followed him to the MacKay camp.

Herron, often described as a Red Tory for his progressive leanings on social issues, was a member of the Progressive Conservative Party until December 2003; he did not support its merger with the Canadian Alliance into the Conservative Party of Canada in 2003, and he refused to join the new party. On February 6, 2004, he announced that he would sit for the remainder of the Parliamentary session as an "independent Progressive Conservative", and that he would run in the 2004 election as a candidate for the Liberal Party of Canada. One of Herron's last official acts as a sitting MP was his deliverance of the "Progressive Conservative party caucus" tribute to retiring party leader Joe Clark in May 2004.

Herron lost his seat in the 2004 election to Conservative Party candidate Rob Moore.

After federal politics

Herron served as president of the Atlantic Centre for Energy from 2008 to 2013 before being appointed by the provincial Progressive Conservative government to a full-time position on the quasi-judicial Energy and Utilities Board for a term of ten years.

Herron continues to reside in Bloomfield, New Brunswick. He is married to Heather Jane Libbey of Cornwall, Ontario. He has two children, Rosemary Kathleen Herron and Patrick Joseph Herron, from a previous marriage.

Electoral history

References

1964 births
Living people
Members of the House of Commons of Canada from New Brunswick
Progressive Conservative Party of Canada MPs
21st-century Canadian politicians
People from Kentville, Nova Scotia